William Loring may refer to:
William Price Loring (1795–1878), Boston silversmith and customs officer and father of Charles Harding Loring
William Loring (Royal Navy officer) (1811–1895), first Commander-in-Chief of the Australia Station
William Wing Loring (1818–1886), American soldier
William Loring (judge) (1851–1930), Justice of the Massachusetts Supreme Judicial Court
 SS William W. Loring, a World War II Liberty ship

Loring, William